Helastia expolita is a moth of the family Geometridae. This species is endemic to New Zealand. It is classified as "At Risk, Relict'" by the Department of Conservation.

Taxonomy
This species was first described by Alfred Philpott in 1917 using a specimen collected by J.H. Lewis at Broken River, Canterbury and named Hydriomena expolita. George Hudson discussed and illustrated this species in his 1928 book The Butterflies and Moths of New Zealand under the same name. In 1987 Robin C. Craw placed this species within the genus Helastia. The holotype specimen is held at the New Zealand Arthropod Collection.

Description
Philpott described the species as follows:

Distribution
This species is endemic to New Zealand. It occurs in Buller, Marlborough, North Canterbury and Mid Canterbury.

Biology and lifecycle
Very little is known about the biology of H. expolita.

Host species and habitat
This species prefers short tussock grassland habitat in montane to subalpine zones. The host species for the larvae of H. expolita is unknown. It has been hypothesised the larvae of H. expolita feed on the flowers of Helichrysum species and then feed on mosses, lichens or shrubs growing nearby.

Conservation status
This moth is classified under the New Zealand Threat Classification system as being "At Risk, Relict". The decline in the area and quality of this species habitat is one of the factors putting this species at risk.

References

Moths of New Zealand
Endemic fauna of New Zealand
Moths described in 1917
Cidariini
Endangered biota of New Zealand
Endemic moths of New Zealand